Kurt-Schumacher-Platz is a station on the  line of the Berlin U-Bahn. There had been a bus link outside the station connecting Berlin's Tegel International Airport to the U-Bahn network.  The station was opened on 3 May 1956 and named after famous German politician Kurt Schumacher.

The station was built by B. Grimmek, and has yellow tiles on the wall. The U6 extension between Seestrasse (Berlin U-Bahn) and Kurt-Schumacher-Platz was the first new subway line built after World War II in Berlin.  After this station, the U6 trains travel above ground towards Alt-Tegel (except that Borsigwerke and Alt-Tegel stations are underground).

References 

U6 (Berlin U-Bahn) stations
Buildings and structures in Reinickendorf
Railway stations in Germany opened in 1956